Sefid Sangan may refer to:
 Sefid Sangan, Fuman
 Sefid Sangan, Talesh